Hal Downey (1877–1959) was an American hematologist.

In 1923, he contributed to the characterization of reactive lymphocytes, which are sometimes called "Downey cells".

References

See also
 Allan Watt Downie

1877 births
1959 deaths
American physiologists